The 2015 Settimana Internazionale di Coppi e Bartali was the 30th edition of the Settimana Internazionale di Coppi e Bartali cycling stage race. It started on 26 March in Gatteo and ended on 29 March in Roccapelago. The race consisted of four stages. As in the 2014 edition, the first stage was divided into two half-stages, with the second half of the first stage being a team time trial.

The race was won by South African rider Louis Meintjes, who claimed the leader's jersey with his win on the final stage. Meintjes beat Ben Swift in the general classification by two seconds. Swift won the second stage and the points classification, Slovenian rider Primož Roglič of  won the mountains classification and 's Simone Petilli from Italy, finished first in the young rider classification for the second year in a row.

Race overview
The 2015 race had four days of racing. The first of these was a split stage, with a road stage followed by a team time trial the same day. The following three days each had one stage, with the final stage a hill-top finish.

Teams
The start list includes 25 teams (1 UCI WorldTeam, 10 Professional Continental Teams, 13 Continental Teams), and an Italian national team.

Stages

Stage 1a
26 March 2015 – Gatteo to Gatteo,

Stage 1b
26 March 2015 –  to Gatteo, team time trial (TTT)

Stage 2
27 March 2015 – Cesenatico to Sogliano al Rubicone,

Stage 3
28 March 2015 – Calderara di Reno to Crevalcore,

Stage 4
29 March 2015 – Pavullo to Roccapelago,

Classifications leadership table

Final standings

General classification

Points classification

Mountains classification

Young rider classification

Team classification

References

External links

Settimana Internazionale di Coppi e Bartali
Settimana
Settimana